The K League Best XI is an award for the best eleven players in a K League season.

K League 1 award (1983–present)

Winners 
Players marked bold won the Most Valuable Player award in that respective year.

Appearances by player

Appearances by nationality

K League 2 award (2013–present) 
Players marked bold won the Most Valuable Player award in that respective year.

Special awards

See also
 K League
 K League MVP Award
 K League Top Scorer Award
 K League Top Assist Provider Award
 K League Manager of the Year Award
 K League Young Player of the Year Award
 K League FANtastic Player
 K League Players' Player of the Year

References

External links
 All-time winners at K League 
 History at K League 
 30th Anniversary Legends Best XI at K League 
 K League Awards at ROKfootball

Best XI
Annual events in South Korea